This is a list of Estonian football transfers in the summer transfer window 2018 by club. Only transfers in Meistriliiga are included.

Meistriliiga

Flora Tallinn

In: 

Out:

FCI Levadia

In: 

Out:

Nõmme Kalju

In: 

Out:

Trans

In: 

Out:

Paide Linnameeskond

In: 

Out:

Tammeka

In: 

Out:

Tulevik

In: 

Out:

Vaprus

In: 

Out:

Kuressaare

In: 

Out:

JK Tallinna Kalev

In: 

Out:

References

External links
 Official site of the Estonian Football Association
 Official site of the Meistriliiga

Estonian
transfers
2018